Noren (暖簾) are traditional Japanese fabric dividers hung between rooms, on walls, in doorways, or in windows.

Noren or Norén is a Swedish surname that may refer to:

Noren
Eric Noren (born 1977), American director of films, commercials and music videos
Irv Noren (1924-2019), American baseball and basketball player
Jack Noren (1929–1990), American jazz drummer and vocalist
Jay Noren, American university administrator

Norén
Alex Norén (born 1982), Swedish golfer 
Carl Norén (born 1983), Swedish singer and songwriter, part of band Sugarplum Fairy
Carolina Norén (born 1965), Swedish radio presenter 
Edmund Norén (1902–1983), Norwegian media executive and politician
Fredrik Norén (1941–2016), Swedish jazz drummer
Gustaf Norén (born 1981), Swedish rock musician and actor, part of band Mando Diao, State of Sound, part of duo Viktor & Gustaf Norén
Lars Norén (born 1944), Swedish playwright, novelist and poet
Nils Norén (born c. 1967), Swedish-American chef and culinary educator
Patrik Norén (born 1992), Swedish ice hockey player
Stig Norén (1908–1996), Swedish Air Force general
Svea Norén (1895–1985), Swedish figure skater
Victor Norén or Viktor Norén (born 1985), Swedish singer and songwriter, part of band Sugarplum Fairy and part of duo Viktor & Gustaf Norén

Characters 
Saga Norén, fictional character and the main protagonist of the Swedish/Danish TV Series The Bridge

Swedish-language surnames